John Frederick "Jack" Lenz is a Canadian composer. He has written, performed, and produced music for film, television, and theatre, along with working on non-soundtrack album ventures. He is also the founder of Live Unity Enterprises, an organization devoted to the production of music for the Baháʼí community.

Lenz contributed additional music for the John Debney score for Mel Gibson's film The Passion of the Christ. Among his current projects is working on a movie about the persecution of Baháʼís in Iran, particularly the story of Mona Mahmudnizhad who suffered under the persecution in Iran, under the title of Mona's Dream.
He was music director of 90 Minutes Live, with Peter Gzowski on CBC Television from 1976 to 1978.

He resides in Toronto, Ontario.

Background
Lenz was born in Eston, Saskatchewan. His mother was also raised in Saskatchewan, and his father came to Canada from Hungary during the Depression. While still in his youth, Lenz took piano lessons from Garth Beckett and later studied composition at the University of Saskatchewan. Lenz became a professional musician when he played keyboards and flute for the soft-rock bands Seals and Crofts and Loggins and Messina touring around the world, performing before large audiences, and recording. Lenz' involvement in children's issues stems partly from having seven children of his own, as well as being in an arena which avoids "the conflict between what I believe about music and its sacred nature and dealing with what a lot of programming deals with, which sometimes could be the worst aspects of human nature."  Lenz joined the Baháʼí Faith in 1969.

Programs
Lenz has done music production work for over 100 programs for various categories of mass media including television series and information/news programming, feature films, movies of the week, documentaries, live to broadcast, and children's television productions for networks like the CBC, NBC, Fox Broadcasting Company, PAX TV, Discovery Channel, Scholastic-HBO, Showtime, and Nelvana / CBS (as well as theatrical works).
 "Battle Dogs" for Discovery Channel US - producer and composer (2018–2019, ten episodes)
 "Good Witch" for Hallmark (2009 to 2019) (composer - all episodes and films)
 "Little Mosque on the Prairie" (2007, 95 episodes)
 "Sue Thomas: F.B. Eye" (12 episodes, 2003–2005)
 "The Passion of the Christ" (feature film, 2004)
 "Goosebumps" (TV series) theme and score for  series (34 episodes)
 "Due South" (TV series) theme and score for entire series (65 episodes and two 2-hour movies)
 "RoboCop: The Series" score and songs for the entire series
 13 years of the Hospital for Sick Children's telethon 
 7 years of YTV's Youth Achievement Awards
 A tribute to renowned author Mordecai Richler – musical direction
 more than twenty separate television productions back to 1983
 Doc, a television series that aired from 2001 to 2004 starring Billy Ray Cyrus as Clint Cassidy, a small-town Montana doctor who moves to New York City.
 "Atomic Betty" theme and music score for all episodes
 "Nanalan" Seasons One and Two - producer and composer - all episodes for Nickelodeon and CBC and YTV
 "Mr. Meaty" Seasons One and Two - producer and composer - all episodes for Nickelodeon
 "Weird Years" producer and Composer - all episodes for YTV
 "Big Voice" producer and composer - all episodes for OWN and W Network
 "Mansions" producer and composer - all episodes for HGTV
 "Big and Small" Season One - producer and composer - (52 episodes) for BBC and Treehouse TV
 "What's Your News" - producer and composer - all episodes for Nick Jr. and CBC
 "Swami Jeff" - producer and composer - all episodes for Teletoon
 "Apollo's Pad" - producer and composer - all episodes for Teletoon
 "Ninjamaica" pilot for Teletoon - producer and composer

Awards
Nominated for several Gemini Awards: 
 Best Original Music Score for a Series for:Due South, episode "Free Willie". (1995)
 Best Original Music Score for a Dramatic Series for: "Due South", episode "The Gift of the Wheelman". (1996)
 Best Pre-School Program or Series for: Nanalan' (2003) (Executive Producer and Music Director)

Winner of several SOCAN Awards:
 14th Annual SOCAN Awards 2003
 Domestic Non-Animated Television Series Music Award
 International Television Series Music Award
 News & Sports Television Programming Music Award
16th Annual SOCAN Awards 2005
Domestic Non-Animated Television Series Music Award

Albums or songs on albums
 Andrea by Andrea Bocelli (2004) (Go Where Love Goes)
 Musical Director of the Inauguration of the Baháʼí Terraces on Mount Carmel in Haifa, Israel, (2001)
 Music from the Second Baháʼí World Congress (1992, released 1994) (4 of 16 songs),
 Expectation (words from the scriptures of Zoroaster, Moses, Isaiah, Krishna, Buddha, Jesus Christ, Muhammad. Music by Jack Lenz)
 See the Light
 Glad Tidings
 Garden of Ridván
 Jewel in the Lotus (1987)  (4 of 10 songs)
 We Are Baha'is (1982)
 Lenz also produced a 6 hr talk on Music and The Arts - The Oneness of Humankind, a spiritual journey explaining the origin of the various art forms and its important necessity in our lives.
 Lenz performed flute on 1977's Loggins and Messina Finale (album).
 Lenz, with Tony Kosinec, Alan Smith and Pat Arbour, wrote the Toronto Blue Jays "OK Blue Jays" song, which has become the Jays anthem, and is sung during the seventh-inning stretch at the Rogers Centre.

Artists
Lenz has done production work for Paul Gross, David Keeley, Doug Cameron,  Adam Crossley, Holly Stell, The Crawling Kingsnakes and Ava Bowers.

References

External links
 
 Millennnium Arts Society - Jack Lenz in conversation with Joseph Lerner
 Mona's Dream

Year of birth missing (living people)
Living people
Canadian people of Hungarian descent
Canadian Bahá'ís
Canadian film score composers
Male film score composers
Canadian television composers
Converts to the Bahá'í Faith
20th-century Bahá'ís
21st-century Bahá'ís